Concession may refer to:

General
 Concession (contract) (sometimes called a concession agreement), a contractual right to carry on a certain kind of business or activity in an area, such as to explore or develop its natural resources or to operate a "concession stand" within a venue
 Concession stand, a temporary or permanent booth that sells snacks or fast food, typically found in movie theaters, amusement parks, fairs, public swimming pools, or festivals
 Concession (territory), an area within one country that is administered by another, usually conceded by a weaker country to a stronger one
 Concession (politics), failure to challenge or cessation of challenging, as in "conceding an election" or "conceding a game"
A step taken during negotiation whereby one party offers up something of value to them in order to work towards an agreement
 Concessional loan, a loan with below-market terms
 Concession road, a grid-based road system in Ontario and Quebec
 Concession, a figure of speech also known as synchoresis
 Concession (contract bridge), in contract bridge, a statement by a player as to the number of remaining tricks that he must lose
 Concession, a discounted price offered to certain classes of people, such as students or the elderly

Locations 
 Concession, Nova Scotia, Canada
 Concession, Zimbabwe

de:Konzession
es:Concesión
eo:Koncesio